A business network is a complex network of companies, working together to accomplish certain goals. Other uses are:

Specific companies 
 Fox Business Network
 Global Business Network
 Russian Business Network

See also 
 Business networking